was a Japanese manga artist. He was best known for his acclaimed dark fantasy series Berserk, which began serialization in 1989 and continued until his death. As of 2021, Berserk had more than 50 million copies in circulation, making it one of the best-selling manga series of all time. In 2002, Miura received the Award for Excellence at the 6th Tezuka Osamu Cultural Prizes.

Early life and education
Miura was born on July 11, 1966, in Chiba, Chiba Prefecture, Japan. In 1976, at the age of 10, he created his first manga, entitled Miuranger, which was published for his classmates in a school publication; the series ended up spanning 40 volumes. In 1977, Miura created his second manga, in which he used India ink for the first time. When he was in middle school in 1979, his drawing techniques improved greatly as he started using professional drawing techniques.

While in high school in 1982, Miura enrolled in an artistic curriculum, where he and his classmates started publishing their works in school booklets. There, he befriended his later fellow manga artist . They both co-authored a science fiction  which was sent to Weekly Shōnen Sunday, but was shot down in the last round of selections. At age 18, Miura briefly worked as an assistant to George Morikawa, of Hajime no Ippo fame. Morikawa quickly acknowledged Miura's high artistic level and dismissed him, saying there was nothing he could teach that Miura did not already know. By then, Miura had a dark warrior with a gigantic sword already illustrated in his portfolio.

Career
In 1985, Miura applied for entrance to the art college of Nihon University. He submitted a short project, for examination and was granted admission. The project later earned him the 34th Newcomer Manga Award from Weekly Shōnen Magazine. Miura's next work, NOA, was published in Fresh Magazine in the same year, but it was not successful. In 1988, while working for Buronson on a project titled , Miura published a prototype of Berserk in Hakusensha's Monthly ComiComi; the 48-page prototype placed second in ComiComis 7th Manga School competition. The full serialization of Berserk, which would become Miura's most famous and successful work, began in Hakusensha's Monthly Animal House in 1989. In 1990, a sequel to King of Wolves, entitled , was published in the same magazine. In 1992, Monthly Animal House was renamed Young Animal, where Berserk continued serialization. In the same year, Miura collaborated with Buronson on the manga Japan, which was also published in Young Animal.

In 1997, Miura supervised the production of a 25-episode anime adaptation of Berserk produced by OLM, Inc., which aired in the same year on NTV. He also supervised the 1999 Dreamcast video game Sword of the Berserk: Guts' Rage. In 2002, Miura received the Award for Excellence at the 6th Tezuka Osamu Cultural Prizes for Berserk. Starting in 2006, Berserk went on frequent and often extended hiatuses, and alternated between monthly and irregular serialization. As of 2018, Berserk was collected into 40  volumes in Japan, and as of May 2021 it had more than 50 million copies in circulation worldwide, including digital versions. The series also spawned a host of merchandise, both official and fan-made, ranging from statues, action figures to key rings, video games, and a trading card game. Various art books and supplemental materials by Miura based on Berserk were also released.

In 2013, Miura released the short standalone manga Giganto Maxia, published in English-speaking territories by Dark Horse in 2016. Duranki, a short manga produced by Miura's personal manga studio Studio Gaga, was serialized in Young Animal Zero in 2019.

Influences
Miura stated that the work that had the biggest impact on his own was Buronson and Tetsuo Hara's manga Fist of the North Star (1983 debut). Miura also cited influences from Go Nagai's Violence Jack (1973 debut), the Japanese fantasy novel series Guin Saga (1979 debut), Paul Verhoeven films, the Hellraiser series (1987 debut),  manga, Disney films, and the works of Hieronymous Bosch, M. C. Escher, Gustave Doré, and Pieter Bruegel.

Death
On May 6, 2021, Miura died due to acute aortic dissection, at the age of 54. His death was publicly announced on May 20, 2021. A private ceremony was held by his family.

Various manga artists offered condolences, including Kouji Mori, Miura's high school friend, and George Morikawa, who shared a story of their friendship. People who worked on the Berserk anime adaptations also paid tribute to Miura, including Susumu Hirasawa, composer for the 1997 series; Nobutoshi Canna and Yūko Miyamura, who voiced Guts and Casca, respectively, in the 1997 series; Hiroaki Iwanaga, Guts' voice actor since the 2012–13 film trilogy; and singer Yoshino Nanjō, who voiced Sonia and performed the ending theme for the 2016 series' second season with Nagi Yanagi.

Legacy
Established as one of the best-selling manga of all time, Miura's series Berserk impacted the manga medium and beyond, with journalist Jade King stating: "[It] is difficult to overstate the tremendous impact his work has had on the world of games, manga, film, anime, and even literature." The image of Guts and his massive sword is attributed to inspiring characters like Cloud Strife of Final Fantasy VII and Dante from the Devil May Cry series, with the overall aesthetic of Berserk inspiring the monsters and world of the Dark Souls series. Video game director Hideaki Itsuno and producer Hiroyuki Kobayashi are fans of Berserk, and the role-playing hack and slash game Dragon's Dogma included armor based on Guts and Griffith's. During a GDC talk in 2019, Itsuno stated that the tone and style of Devil May Cry 5 was inspired from Berserk.

Many authors have cited Miura and Berserk as influences, including Blue Exorcist author Kazue Kato, Baccano! and Durarara!! author Ryōgo Narita, Black Butler author Yana Toboso, Black Clover author Yūki Tabata, and Attack on Titan author Hajime Isayama, who called it "tremendous, just magnificent [...] I got the impression that it was very well organized like a movie". Yoko Taro stated that the protagonist of Drakengard, Caim, was inspired by Berserk'''s protagonist Guts.

A "memorial" Young Animal issue dedicated to Miura was released on September 10, 2021. Besides the inclusion of the posthumous chapter 364 of Berserk, the issue featured a special "Messages to Kentarou Miura" booklet and a poster of "famous scenes" from the manga. In the issue, manga artist Kouji Mori, Miura's long-time friend, published a one-shot titled "Mori-chan Ken-chan", which tells the story of Mori's friendship with Miura.

On June 7, 2022, Hakusensha and Kouji Mori announced that Berserk would continue publication, using plans and thoughts that were relayed to Mori by Miura himself, as well as memorandums and character designs that Miura left behind. As the only person who knows the ending Miura intended, Mori agreed to continue the series and promised: "I will only write the episodes that Miura talked to me about. I will not flesh it out. I will not write episodes that I don't remember clearly. I will only write the lines and stories that Miura described to me." The credits appear as "original work by Kentaro Miura, art by Studio Gaga, supervised by Kouji Mori".

Works
  (1985) — One-shot. Published in Kodansha's Weekly Shōnen Magazine.
 NOA (1985) — One-shot. Published in Kodansha's Fresh Magazine.
  (1988) — One-shot. Published in Hakusensha's Monthly ComiComi.
  (1989) — Written by Buronson, illustrated by Miura. Serialized in Hakusensha's Monthly Animal House.
  (1989–2021) — Serialized in Hakusensha's Monthly Animal House (1989–1992) and Young Animal (1992–2021).
  (1990) — Written by Buronson, illustrated by Miura. Serialized in Hakusensha's Monthly Animal House.
  (1992)  —  Written by Buronson, illustrated by Miura. Serialized in Hakusensha's Young Animal.
  (2013–2014) — Serialized in Hakusensha's Young Animal.
  (2019–2020) — Serialized in Hakusensha's Young Animal Zero''.

References

External links
 
 

1966 births
2021 deaths
Dark fantasy writers
Manga artists from Chiba Prefecture
Mythopoeic writers
People from Chiba (city)
Deaths from aortic dissection
Nihon University alumni